Do Asb (also Romanized as Dow Asb and Duasb; also known as Duvast) is a village in Bonab Rural District, in the Central District of Zanjan County, Zanjan Province, Iran. At the 2006 census, its population was 708, in 154 families.

References 

Populated places in Zanjan County